Dan Bilefsky is an international correspondent for The New York Times who in 2018 returned to his hometown of Montreal after 28 years abroad. Among other things, he has covered Russia's invasion of Ukraine, the conflict in Gaza and the fall of Afghanistan to the Taliban. He was part of the Times's team that investigated the assassination of the Haitian President, an investigation that won a Polk Award and was a Pulitzer finalist.

Before returning to Canada, he was a London and Paris correspondent for The Times, and covered Brexit, the European refugee crisis, the 2015 terrorist attacks at the Bataclan nightclub and the pimping trial of Dominique Strauss-Kahn.

While a correspondent in London Bilefsky wrote on an audacious heist by a gang of men in their 60s and 70s, known as the "Bad Grandpas," who stole about $20 million in diamonds, gold and gems from Hatton Garden, the city's medieval jewellery district, in April 2015. It was the largest burglary in England's history. The story was optioned by Hollywood and Bilefsky has written a book on the caper, "The Last Job," which was published by Norton in April 2020. The best-selling detective novelist Louise Penny called the book "a fabulous read, gripping, at times hilarious, at times, terrifying, always astonishing...Using his skills as an investigative reporter, Bilefsky pieces together a study of hubris and idiocy, of greed and camaraderie, and he does it with lyrical, moving, powerful prose. A wonderful book about an almost unbelievable crime.”

Biography
Born in Montreal, Quebec, Canada, Bilefsky was formerly the Times' Brussels bureau chief. A graduate of Oxford University and the University of Pennsylvania, Bilefsky has also worked as a reporter for The Wall Street Journal and The Financial Times and has been a correspondent for The New York Times based in New York, Istanbul and Prague.

As a roving correspondent, Bilefsky has written on many subjects, from honor killings in Turkey to bullfighting in Portugal and the hunt for the Bosnian-Serb war crimes fugitive Ratko Mladic in the Balkans. In New York, he reported on what prosecutors called the most elaborate frame-up in recent law enforcement history: the bizarre case of a Queens man who raped his girlfriend and then framed her for a series of brazen crimes that never took place. But his work also includes the more light-hearted, such as the world's most high-tech brothel, in Antwerp.

Bilefsky covered the independence of Kosovo in February 2008 and, six months later, the war between Russia and Georgia.

In the summer of 2008, Bilefsky set out for the mountains of northern Albania to chronicle the ancient custom of "sworn virgins", women who forsake marriage, sex and children in order to become the "men of the house".

He is the co-editor of Birth of the Euro: Financial Times's Guide to the Single Currency (London: Penguin Books, 1998).

References

Canadian male journalists
Canadian male non-fiction writers
Canadian newspaper journalists
Journalists from Montreal
Living people
Year of birth missing (living people)
Writers from Montreal
Alumni of the University of Oxford
University of Pennsylvania alumni